Angel Beltrán (born 26 April 1973) is a Cuban volleyball player. He competed in the men's tournament at the 1996 Summer Olympics.

References

1973 births
Living people
Cuban men's volleyball players
Olympic volleyball players of Cuba
Volleyball players at the 1996 Summer Olympics
Place of birth missing (living people)